The Nigerian Army (NA) is the land force of the Nigerian Armed Forces. It is governed by the Nigerian Army Council (NAC). The Chief of Army Staff is the highest ranking military officer of the Nigerian Army.

History

Formation
The Nigerian Army traces its history to Lieutenant John Hawley Glover's Constabulary Force, which was largely composed of freed Hausa slaves in 1863. The Constabulary Force was established with the primary goal of protecting the Royal Niger Company and its assets from constant military incursions by the neighboring Ashanti Empire. This policing force would slowly grow in size and capability to meet the needs of the British Empire in its West African territories, and would later form the nucleus of both the Gold Coast and the Hausa Constabulary, both of which would become the Ghana Regiment and Southern Nigeria Regiment respectively by 1879. These regiments would be incorporated into the Royal West African Frontier Force (RWAFF) in 1900 by the British Colonial Office, following British military experiences in the Benin Expedition of 1897, as well as wider British efforts of complete reorganization of its African colonial units such as that of the Egyptian Army earlier in the year. During the Second World War, British-trained Nigerian troops saw action with the 1st (West Africa) Infantry Brigade, the 81st and the 82nd (West Africa) Divisions which fought in the East African Campaign (World War II) and in the Far East.

Independence and civil war
The roots of the ethnic cleavages which started to rip through the army after independence had some of their origins in colonial recruiting practices, with line infantry and the artillery being raised from the North, but during the expansion of the force during the Second World War a large proportion of more educated southerners being brought in to take up posts that required more technical training. Like in Ghana, there was significant pressure to "Nigerianize" the armed forces, with, for example, two officers being promoted to Brigadier as a concession to public opinion on the occasion of the last British commander arriving in Lagos. From a force of 8,000 in five infantry battalions and supporting units, strength rose to around 120,000 in three divisions by the end of the Nigerian Civil War in 1970. In terms of doctrine, the task of the Federal Nigerian army did not fundamentally change: its task remained to close with and defeat an organized enemy.

The rapid expansion of the Nigerian Army in the wake of the civil war witnessed a severe decline in troop quality. The expansion process overseen by the Nigerian army command staff led to an extreme shortage of commissioned officers, with newly created lieutenant-colonels commanding brigades, and platoons and companies often commanded by sergeants and warrant officers. This resulted in tentative command-and-control and in rudimentary staff work by Nigerian army personnel. One result of the weak direction was that the federal government's three field divisions fought independently, and competed for men and material. Writing in a 1984 study, Major Michael Stafford of the United States Marine Corps noted the following: "Inexperienced, poorly trained and ineptly led soldiers manifested their lack of professionalism and indiscipline by massacres of innocent civilians and a failure to effectively execute infantry tactics." Among the results of this failure of command experience and professionalism was the 1967 Asaba massacre, resulting in the deaths of some one thousand civilians and individuals of Igbo descent.

In November 1970, the U.S. intelligence community concluded the following: "The Nigerian Civil War ended with surprisingly little rancor. The defeated Igbos are accepted as fellow citizens in many parts of Nigeria, but not in some areas of former Biafra where they were once dominant. [Iboland] is an overpoperated, economically depressed area, where massive unemployment is likely to prevail for some years." Furthermore, U.S. analysts would go on to state that: "Nigeria is still very much a tribal society, in which clan, tribal and regional jealousies, hostilities and interests count for more than national attachment. General Gowon, Head of the Federal Military Government (FMG), is the accepted national leader and his popularity has grown since the end of the war. The FMG is neither very efficient nor dynamic, but the recent announcement that it intends to retain power for six more years has generated little opposition so far. The Nigerian Army, vastly expanded during the war, is both the main support to the FMG and the chief threat to it. The troops are poorly trained and disciplined and some of the officers are turning to conspiracies and plotting. We think Gowon will have great difficulty in staying in office through the period which he said is necessary before the turnover of power to civilians. His sudden removal would dim the prospects for Nigerian stability."

The influence of individual personalities is generally greater in the armies of developing states, as they tend to have weaker institutional frameworks. Key personalities involved in Nigeria included then-Colonel Olusegun Obasanjo. Obasanjo was particularly important due to his efforts to reorganize his command, 3 Division, during the civil war to improve its logistics and administration. The reorganization he instituted permitted 3 Division to successfully conduct the offensive operations that would ultimately lead to the end the civil war in Nigeria. The Nigerian Army fought the Civil War significantly under-resourced; Obasanjo's memoirs chronicle the lack of any stocks of extra equipment for mobilisation and the "haphazard and unreliable system of procurement and provisioning" which lasted for the entire period of the war. Arms embargoes imposed by several Western countries made the situation more difficult.

At the end of the Civil War, the three divisions of the Army were reorganised into four divisions, with each controlling territories running from North to South in order to deemphasise the former regional structure. Each division thus had access to the sea thereby making triservice cooperation and logistic support easier. This deployment formula was later abandoned in favour of the present assignment of sectors to the divisions. Thus 1 Division with HQ at Kaduna is allocated the North West sector; 2 Division with HQ at Ibadan South West sector, 3 Division with HQ at Jos North East sector and 82 Division with HQ at Enugu South East sector.

Recent history
Its formations include the 1 Division, headquartered in Kaduna in the north-west, and 2 Division (HQ Ibadan in the South-West, which includes 32 Artillery Brigade at Abeokuta). 2nd Division also possibly includes 4 Brigade at Benin City, with 19 Battalion at Okitipupa and 195 Battalion at Agenebode. 52 Signal Regiment may be the divisional signals unit. 3 Division's headquarters is at Rukuba Cantonment, Jos, in the North-East, and includes 21 Armoured Brigade Maiduguri, 23 Brigade Yola, and 33 Artillery Brigades. 81st Division (Amphibious) HQ in Lagos, which includes the 9 Brigade, based at Ikeja Cantonment in northern Lagos, 82nd Division (Airborne and Amphibious) HQ in Enugu in the South-East, which includes the 2 Brigade at Port Harcourt, 13 Brigade at Calabar and the 34th Artillery Brigade at Obinze/Owerri. The Composite Division at Enugu was formed in 1964 as 4 Division, in 1975 became Lagos Garrison Organization; in 1981 became 4 Composite Division; became a Composite Division in May 2002. 3rd Armoured Division was responsible in 1983 for the security of areas bordering Chad.
	 
Lagos and Abuja have garrison commands, with the Lagos garrison as large as a division. 81st Division was previously the youngest division, formed on 26 May 2002 when the Lagos Garrison Command (as it then was) was upgraded to divisional status. The Division, therefore, inherited the security roles hitherto performed by the defunct Lagos Garrison Command. However a later undated article in a Nigerian online newspaper says the 81st Division was later again renamed the Lagos Garrison Command. In the 1980s, the Army's brigades included the 7th Infantry Brigade in Sokoto. There are also Divisional Artillery Brigades, among which are the 32 and 34 Artillery Brigades, ordnance corps units as well as Combat Engineer Regiments, and many other service support units spread across the country.
	 
The 7th Division (also known as JTF-RO) was established in August 2013 for the war against Boko Haram. The creation of the new division brought to six the number of divisions. The 7th division is headquartered in Maiduguri. The division includes a combat motorcycle unit as part of its 25th Task Force Brigade. The purpose of this unit is stated as securing roads in Yobe and serving as a force multiplier in combat operations. Training and Doctrine Command formed in 1981, and is located at Minna. It supervises the Army's schools, including the Depot. The Army sponsors the Nigerian Military School at Zaria and Command Secondary Schools all over the federation.

Structure
The Nigerian Army as of 2016 consisted of some 6,000 officers and 150,000 enlisted personnel. The army itself is governed by the Nigerian Army Council (NAC). The Nigerian Army is functionally organized into combat arms, which are infantry and armoured; the combat support arms, which are artillery, engineers, signals, and intelligence; the combat support services comprise the Nigerian Army Medical Corps, supply and transport, ordinance and finance. Others include the military police, physical training, chaplains, public relations and the Nigerian Army Band Corps.  The Training and Doctrine Command (TRADOC) located in Minna is responsible for doctrinal, training and combat development, and supervises training centers. There are 17 Corps Training Schools and the Nigerian Army College of Logistics (NACOL).

The Nigerian Army said its newly created the 6 Division in Port Harcourt was established to organize and improve its internal security operations in four states of the Niger Delta. The division will cover the army's 2 Brigade in Akwa Ibom, 16 Brigade in Bayelsa, and 63 Brigade in Delta respectively; while the divisional headquarters will be located in Port Harcourt. This arrangement will help to curtail activities of militants, banditry, inter-communal clashes, illegal bunkering, kidnapping, robberies, Niger Delta Avengers and pipeline vandalism prevalent in the area. Insecurity in these states negatively impacts on the national economy resulting from sabotage by criminal entities within the region.

Formations
Current formations include:
 
1 Mechanized Division — HQ in Kaduna
1 Mechanised Brigade
3 Motorised Brigade
31 Field Artillery Brigade
214 Recce Battalion
2 Mechanized Division — HQ in Ibadan
4 Mechanised Brigade
9 Motorised Brigade
32 Field Artillery Brigade
42 Engineering Brigade 
244 Recce Battalion
3 Armoured Division — HQ in Jos
21 Armoured Brigade
23 Armoured Brigade
33 Field Artillery Brigade
Engineer Brigade (status unknown)
243 Recce Battalion
6 Amphibious Division — HQ in Port Harcourt
2 Brigade
16 Brigade
63 Brigade
42 Engineering Brigade 
Recce Battalion
7 Infantry Division (OP-LD) — HQ in Maiduguri
21 Brigade
22 Brigade
23 Brigade
Engineer Brigade (status unknown)
241 Recce Battalion
8 Task Force Division — HQ in Sokoto
?? Brigade
?? Brigade
?? Brigade
Engineer Brigade (status unknown)
?? Recce Battalion
81 Division (Amphibious) — HQ in Lagos
19 Mechanised Battalion
165 Mechanised Battalion
242 Recce Battalion
82 Composite Division (Airborne and Amphibious) — HQ in Enugu
2 Amphibious Brigade
13 Motorised Brigade
34 Field Artillery Brigade
7 Amphibious Battalion
93 Amphibious Battalion
103 Amphibious Battalion, Garikki.
146 Amphibious Battalion
245 Recce Battalion
Guards Brigade — HQ in Abuja
3rd Battalion
7th Battalion
26th Battalion

Geographical distribution

Military locations 

The following are installations owned by the Nigerian Army:

 Ribadu Cantonment (Kaduna)
 Adaka Boro Barracks (Elele)
 Giwa Barracks (Maiduguri)
 Maimalari Barracks (Maiduguri)
 Fort Nagwamatse (Kontagora)
 Obienu Barracks (Bauchi)
 Ejoor Barracks (Effurun)
 Camp Wu Bassey (Abuja)
 Fort IBB (formerly Fort Obasanjo) in Abuja
 Sani Abacha Barracks (Abuja)
 Yakubu Gowon Barracks (Abuja)
 Aguiyi-Ironsi Barracks (Abuja)
 Gado Nasko Barracks (Abuja)
 Mogadishu Barracks (Abuja)

Military forces abroad

In December 1983 the new régime of the Head of State of Nigeria, Major General Muhammadu Buhari, announced that Nigeria could no longer afford an activist anti-colonial role in Africa. Anglophone members of the Economic Community of West African States (ECOWAS) established ECOMOG, dominated by the Nigerian Army, in 1990 to intervene in the civil war in Liberia. Smaller army forces had previously carried out UN and ECOWAS deployments in the former Yugoslavia, Angola, Rwanda, Somalia, and Sierra Leone.

The anti-colonial policy statement did not deter Nigeria under Generals Ibrahim Babangida in 1990 and Sani Abacha in 1997 from sending peacekeeping troops as part of ECOMOG under the auspices of ECOWAS into Liberia and later into Sierra Leone when civil wars broke out in those countries. President Olusegun Obasanjo in August 2003 committed Nigerian troops once again into Liberia, at the urging of the United States, to provide an interim presence until the UN's force UNMIL arrived. Charles Taylor was subsequently eased out of power by U.S. pressure and exiled to Nigeria.

In October 2004, Nigerian troops were deployed into Darfur, Sudan to spearhead an African Union force to protect civilians there.

In January 2013, Nigeria began to deploy troops to Mali as part of the African-led International Support Mission to Mali.

Nigeria claimed to have contributed more than twenty thousand troops and police officers to various UN missions since 1960. The Nigeria Police Force and troops have served in places like UNIPOM (UN India-Pakistan Observer mission) 1965, UNIFIL in Lebanon 1978, the UN observer mission, UNIIMOG supervising the Iran-Iraq ceasefire in 1988, former Yugoslavia 1998, East Timor 1999, and in the Democratic Republic of the Congo (MONUC) 2004.

Nigerian Army officers have served as chiefs of defence in other countries, with Brigadier General Maxwell Khobe serving as Sierra Leone chief of staff in 1998–1999, and Nigerian officers acting as Command Officer-in-Charge of the Armed Forces of Liberia from at least 2007.

Chiefs of the Nigerian Army
Following is a chronological list of officers holding the position of General Officer Commanding (GOC) or Chief of Army Staff (COAS).

Equipment

Despite a disproportionate emphasis on the materiel and sophistication of the Nigerian Armed Forces, and despite possessing some formidable hardware, the Army has been hamstrung by technical deficiency and an exceptionally poor standard of maintenance. Its overabundance of foreign suppliers, including Austria, Brazil, France, Germany, Italy, Sweden, Switzerland, Romania, Turkey, Ukraine, the former Soviet Union, the United States and the United Kingdom, has also complicated logistics. Calculating the size and scope of replacement inventories alone is impossible given the menagerie of equipment in use.

The Nigerian Army maintains at least eighty-two different weapon systems and 194 types of ammunition, of sixty-two different categories, from fourteen manufacturers.

See also 
 Zaki Biam Massacre
 Timeline of Boko Haram insurgency

References

External links

 
1960 establishments in Nigeria
Defence agencies of Nigeria
Military of Nigeria